Donna Caroll (28 May 1938 - 31 March 2020) was an Argentine jazz singer and actress.

Life and career
Born Linda René Abadi in Buenos Aires, in the mid-sixties she won an audition for Canal 11 and was cast in the musical show Show 90, who gave her immediate popularity. After having strengthened her notoriety thanks to the participation to other shows and to a very popular jingle she recorded for Gancia vermouth, in 1966 she recorded her first album, Sol de medianoche. During her career she recorded songs in Spanish, English, French, Italian and Portuguese and recorded albums in France, Spain and Puerto Rico. She was also a stage actress, specialized in musical comedies. She received several awards, including the Premio Martín Fierro and the Konex Award.

After a failed marriage with an Arab businessman, she was married from 1966 until her death with the guitarist and composer Oscar López Ruiz, with whom she frequently collaborated on stage and in recordings. She died at the age of 81 of cardiac arrest.

References

External links 
 
 
 

1938 births
2020 deaths
People from Buenos Aires
Argentine jazz singers
Argentine women singers
Argentine stage actresses